Leap of Faith is a 1992 American comedy-drama film directed by Richard Pearce and starring Steve Martin, Debra Winger, Lolita Davidovich, Liam Neeson, and Lukas Haas. The film is about Jonas Nightengale, a Christian faith healer who uses his revival meetings to milk money out of the inhabitants  of Rustwater, Kansas.

Plot
Faith healer Jonas Nightengale and his manager Jane Larson break down in Rustwater, Kansas, a small, rural town suffering from a long drought. Learning they will be stuck there for four days waiting for replacement parts to come in for their truck, Jonas decides to hold revival meetings to help pay for the repairs on the truck.

Jonas and his staff use various cons to make it appear as if Jonas has divine knowledge granted by God. Despite his repeated diversions whenever he is asked when the drought will end, the townspeople find Jonas’s shows to be entertaining and hope-inspiring, and eagerly give their money to Jonas as donations.

Local sheriff Will Braverman is skeptical and decides to investigate Jonas' past. He learns that Jonas is in fact Jack Newton, a native of New York City who lived a life of crime in his teen years. Braverman shares this information with the townspeople, who have gathered for another tent revival. Jonas storms off the stage, soon returning to successfully spin Braverman's report, leaving the crowd more energized than ever, much to Braverman's exasperation. Nightengale continues his dubious ministry over the next several days as Jane and Braverman find themselves falling for each other.

Nightengale attempts to begin a relationship with local diner waitress Marva, whose brother Boyd walks with crutches following an auto accident. She explains that doctors could not find anything physically wrong with Boyd and his ailment is psychosomatic. Boyd comes to believe that Jonas can make him walk again. During a meeting, Boyd walks to the crucifix and touches the feet of Jesus. He drops his crutches and begins to walk unassisted. The awed crowd sweeps the stage. After the show, an enraged Jonas rails to Jane that he was conned and that Boyd upstaged him.

After the revival, Jonas enters the empty, darkened tent and mocks the crucifix and Christianity. Boyd walks in while Jonas is talking and says he wants to join Jonas on the road. Jonas agrees to meet Boyd the following morning, implying Boyd can come. Marva arrives and sends Boyd out of the tent. She thanks Jonas, who tells her that he will not be meeting her brother Boyd the next morning.

Jonas leaves the tent and sees the crowd that has gathered just outside it — many praying, some sleeping in groups, and others feeding the crowd that has gathered. He begins to understand that Boyd's miracle, and the faith that enabled it, are real after all. He packs a bag and departs alone under the cover of darkness, leaving behind his entire road show and hitching a ride with a truck driver bound for Pensacola, Florida. When asked by the driver if he is in some kind of trouble, Jonas replies, "No sir, no sir. Probably for the first time in my life". As they continue to ride along, the drought, threatening the crop harvest that is the centerpiece of the town's economy, comes to a dramatic end with a miraculous downpour. Jonas laughs silently to himself as he realizes the truth, and the film ends as he rides off into the stormy evening, hanging out the truck window loudly thanking Jesus for the rain.

Cast
 Steve Martin as Jonas Nightengale/Jack Newton
 Debra Winger as Jane Larson
 Lolita Davidovich as Marva
 Liam Neeson as Sheriff Will Braverman
 Lukas Haas as Boyd
 Albertina Walker as Lucille
 Meat Loaf as Hoover
 Philip Seymour Hoffman as Matt
 M. C. Gainey as Tiny
 La Chanze as Georgette
 Delores Hall as Ornella
 Phyllis Somerville as Dolores 
 Troy Evans as Officer Lowell Dade
 Ricky Dillard as Choirmaster

Production

Filming
The movie was filmed in Groom, Claude, and Tulia, Texas, though parts of the movie were filmed in Plainview, where the town water tower still has the fictional town mascot painted on the side. Michael Keaton was considered for the starring role however ultimately Martin was cast. The consultant for cons and frauds was Ricky Jay who was called in a 1993 article of The New Yorker as "perhaps the most gifted sleight-of-hand artist alive".

Reception
On Rotten Tomatoes the film has an approval rating of 64% based on reviews from 22 critics. The site's consensus states: "Steve Martin's layered performance transcends Leap of Faiths somewhat undercooked narrative."

Roger Ebert of the Chicago Sun-Times gave the film 3 out of 4, and wrote: "The movie itself has considerable qualities, among them Martin's performance as Nightengale. This isn't the sleek, groomed, prosperous Steve Martin we've seen in movies like L.A. Story. It's Martin as a seedy, desperate, bright, greedy man without hope."
Janet Maslin of The New York Times wrote: "Well acted and amusingly told, featuring a fine performance by Steve Martin in the central role, this tale ultimately switches gears and takes a deeply serious turn."

Musical adaptation

The Center Theatre Group presented the musical at the Ahmanson Theatre, Los Angeles, with Rob Ashford as director and choreographer. Performances began on September 11, 2010, with an official opening on October 3, 2010, running through October 24, 2010. Raul Esparza played the role of Jonas Nightengale and Brooke Shields played the role of Marva. The musical began previews on Broadway at the St. James Theatre on April 3, 2012, and opened on April 26, 2012 before closing after only 20 performances.  Direction was by Christopher Ashley, choreography by Sergio Trujillo, a revised book by Warren Leight, with a cast featuring Raúl Esparza as Jonas Nightengale, and Jessica Phillips as Marva.

References

External links
 
 
 

 Faith Healers deal in phony shows and false hopes The Observer
 Randi and Popoff BBC 9 Dec 06
 Listing notes for The Faith Healers, by James Randi, which formed the basis for this film.
 On Entering the Third Decade by Paul Kurtz
 The third eye by Pat Reeder

1992 films
1992 comedy-drama films
American comedy-drama films
Films scored by Cliff Eidelman
Films about Christianity
Films about con artists
Films about religion
Films directed by Richard Pearce
Films set in Kansas
Films shot in Texas
Paramount Pictures films
Religious comedy films
1990s English-language films
1990s American films
Films about faith healing